Drums in the Deep South is an American Civil War war western film directed by William Cameron Menzies who was production designer of David O. Selznick's Gone With the Wind (1939) and also designed the cave sequences in Selznick's The Adventures of Tom Sawyer (1938). Based on a story by Civil War author Hollister Noble, the film was produced by an independent company King Brothers Productions, filmed in SuperCineColor and released by RKO Pictures in September 1951.  B. Reeves Eason directed the second unit.

Plot
Best friends Clay Clayburn (James Craig) and Will Denning (Guy Madison) graduate from West Point and visit their friend and fellow graduate Braxton (Craig Stevens)  at his Georgia plantation in 1861. Clay had once loved Braxton's wife Kathy (Barbara Payton) and still does.  When war is declared they soon find themselves fighting on opposite sides of the Civil War.

By 1864, Clay now a Field Artillery Major in the Confederate States Army is renowned for accepting but surviving suicide missions.  He is given another.  To delay General Sherman's March to the Sea, a local guide can lead a party of men and their disassembled cannon inside caves that lead to the top of Devil's Mountain where a battery of guns can destroy the railroad and the Union troop and supply trains that travel it, buying time for the Confederacy.  Devil's Mountain is coincidentally near Braxton's (who is now fighting elsewhere for the Confederacy) and Kathy's old plantation where Kathy remains with her uncle (Taylor Holmes).  Kathy agrees to monitor the activities of the Northern invaders and signal Clay's outpost from her window through a mirror by day and a lantern by night. Through her activities, Clay's men are notified of the arrival of two supply trains and destroy both of them.

Arriving at the plantation is Will, who is now a Field Artillery Major in the Union Army.  When the two men meet each other in combat, neither knows it as each is in an artillery position hundreds of yards from the other. However, the love of Clay's life, Kathy Summers, does know and tries desperately to save her two good friends from killing each other.

The Union Field Artillery cannot achieve the elevation or range with their cannon to clear the Confederate guns at the top of the mountain.  Inside the mountain, the Union Infantry cannot find the path to the top and is delayed by Confederate snipers.

As the railroad line has been blocked by two destroyed trains, Union headquarters send a giant Naval Dahlgren gun manned by sailors and mounted on a flat car that can wipe out the Confederates.  Kathy is able to supply Clay's guns with wire from her piano that is used to reinforce the barrel of one of Clay's guns that with a double charge and the maximum elevation is able to destroy the naval gun and further block the railroad line.

Will has Union Army Engineers mine the inside of the mountain with explosives that will blow the top of the mountain. Kathy wishes to act as a mediator to get Clay and his men to surrender that the Union army is keen on as it will save time.  However, Clay calculates that the explosion will send the cliff down over the railway line further blocking the Union's supplies.

Cast

 James Craig as Maj. Clay Clayburn
 Barbara Payton as Kathy Summers
 Guy Madison as Maj. Will Denning
 Barton MacLane as Sgt. Mac McCardle
 Robert Osterloh as Sgt. Harper
 Tom Fadden as Purdy
 Robert Easton as Jerry
 Louis Jean Heydt as Col. House
 Craig Stevens as Col. Braxton Summers
 Taylor Holmes as Albert Monroe
 Lewis Martin as Gen. Johnston
 Peter Brocco as Union corporal
 Dan White as Corp. Jennings

Unbilled

 Robert Clarke: Union officer
 Kenne Duncan: Union Officer
 Roy Gordon: Lt. Col. Fitzgerald
 James Griffith: Union officer who reports to Maj. Denning
 Myron Healey: Union lieutenant
 Todd Karns: Union captain
 Norman Leavitt: Confederate soldier
 Frank Marlowe: Confederate soldier
 Tom Monroe: Confederate soldier
 Billy Nelson: Union sergeant
 Steve Pendleton: Capt. Travis
 Denver Pyle: Union soldier who breaks the window
 Mickey Simpson: Jim Burns, Confederate soldier
 Ray Walker: Union officer
 Guy Wilkerson: Confederate sentry

Production
Drums in the Deep South was the first from a new production set up by the King Brothers which involved them raising finance by selling shares. 300,000 shares worth $300,000 were issued to over 700 investors for Drums. The film was shot at Sam Goldwyn Studios and on location in Sonora, California. The railroad scenes were filmed on the Sierra Railroad in Tuolumne County, California.

Soundtrack
"Dixie" (by Daniel Decatur Emmett)
"Battle Hymn of the Republic" (by William Steffe)
"Barbara Allen" (traditional)
"Down by the Riverside"
"The Old Gray Mare"

Reception
The King Brothers sold Drums in the Deep South to RKO, who distributed the film. Drums in the Deep South was profitable and King Brothers announced plans to reunite Craig, Madison, and Payton in a follow-up film called Murder March about the March to the Sea but it never went into production. Reviewer Jim Craddock in a later review, noted the plot in Drums in the Deep South was "... hampered by a familiar premise".

The King Brothers later sued RKO for mismanaging the distribution and sale of the film, claiming $10,000 in damages.

References

Notes

Bibliography

 Craddock, Jim, ed. Video Hounds Golden Movie Retriever 2001. New York: Gale Group, 2000. .
Goble, Alan, ed. The Complete Index to Literary Sources in Film. Walter de Gryter, 1999 (reprint ed.).

External links
 
 
 
 

1951 films
1950s historical drama films
American historical drama films
American war drama films
1951 Western (genre) films
American Western (genre) films
Films scored by Dimitri Tiomkin
American Civil War films
RKO Pictures films
Cinecolor films
1950s war drama films
1951 drama films
Films directed by William Cameron Menzies
1950s English-language films
1950s American films